Deepak Dinkar is an Indian anchor and actor, who has primarily appeared in Tamil television. He is most known for his role as Tamil in the prime time Sun TV serial Thendral. He is known for acting in many serials, notably Anni, Rekkai Kattiya Manasu, Manaivi, Malargal, Selvi, Bhandham, Ketti Melam, Arasi & Thirumathi Selvam. He is also a television host for various shows notably Jodi Number One on Star Vijay and Dance Jodi Dance on Zee Tamil. Currently, Deepak is acting in the soap Thamizhum Saraswathiyhum on Star Vijay.

Personal life 
Deepak did his schooling in Gill Adarsh Matriculation Higher Secondary School, Chennai and studied Economics at Loyola College. He is married to S. Sivaranjani and has a son named Agnidh.

Career 
Deepak started his career in modelling while studying in college. After completing his studies, he became a video jockey. Later he pursued his career as an television actor and is notable for playing both positive roles in serials like Anni, Bhandham and Thendral, where he played the male lead, as well as negative roles in Manaivi, Malargal, Selvi and Thirumathi Selvam. He participated in Jodi Number One in the first season and later became a host in the second season in Star Vijay. He has acted in films including Uyarthiru 420. He was also the male lead in a film called  Ivanuku Thannila Gandam.

Television

Serials

Shows
Reality Shows

Corporate Shows
 Nokia (Annual day)
 Pride Hotels (New Year)
 Jennys Club – Coimbatore (New Year) 
 eBay PayPal (Annual day)
 Promotion of Surya Kathir Magazine
 Annual event of Tamil Nadu Arya Vaishya Mahila Sabha
 Round Table 107 (Pondicherry) – Annual Event
 Tamil Sangam of Chicago Illinois

Filmography

Actor

Dubbing artist

Awards and honors

Awards

Honors
Recognized by The Punjab Association as the "Jewel in the Crown of Adarsh"

References

1979 births
Living people
Tamil male television actors
Television personalities from Tamil Nadu
Tamil television presenters
Male actors from Chennai
Male actors in Tamil cinema
21st-century Tamil male actors
Tamil Reality dancing competition contestants